The Tiberian vocalization, Tiberian pointing, or Tiberian niqqud (Hebrew:  haNīqqūḏ haṬəḇērīyānī) is a system of diacritics (niqqud) devised by the Masoretes of Tiberias to add to the consonantal text of the Hebrew Bible to produce the Masoretic Text. The system soon became used to vocalize other Hebrew texts, as well.

The Tiberian vocalization marks vowels and stress, makes fine distinctions of consonant quality and length, and serves as punctuation. While the Tiberian system was devised for Tiberian Hebrew, it has become the dominant system for vocalizing all forms of Hebrew and has long since eclipsed the Babylonian and Palestinian vocalization systems.

Consonant diacritics
A dagesh indicates a consonant is geminate or unspirantized, and a raphe indicates spirantization. The mappiq indicates that  is consonantal, not silent, in syllable-coda position.

Vowel diacritics
The seven vowel qualities of Tiberian Hebrew are indicated straightforwardly by distinct diacritics:

The diacritics qubutz and shuruq both represent , but shuruq is used when the text uses full spelling (with waw as a mater lectionis). Each of the vowel phonemes could be allophonically lengthened; occasionally, the length is marked with metheg. (Then, metheg also can indirectly indicate when a following shva is vocal.)

The ultrashort vowels are slightly more complicated. There were two graphemes corresponding to the vowel , attested by alternations in manuscripts like .‎. In addition, one of the graphemes could also be silent:

Shva was used both to indicate lack of a vowel (quiescent šwa, shva nah) and as another symbol to represent the phoneme  (mobile šwa, shva na), the latter also represented by hataf patah. Before a laryngeal-pharyngeal, mobile šwa was pronounced as an ultrashort copy of the following vowel and as  preceding ,. Using ḥataf vowels was mandatory under gutturals but optional under other letters, and there was considerable variation among manuscripts.

That is referenced specifically by medieval grammarians:

The names of the vowel diacritics are iconic and show some variation:

Cantillation
Cantillation signs mark stress and punctuation. Metheg may mark secondary stress, and maqqaf conjoins words into one stress unit, which normally takes only one cantillation mark on the final word in the unit.

See also
 Babylonian vocalization
 Hebrew cantillation
 Cardinal vowels
 Niqqud
 Palestinian vocalization
 Tiberian Hebrew

References

Sources
 
 
 

Language of the Hebrew Bible
Hebrew alphabet